The Incredible Hulk is an American animated television series starring the Marvel Comics character the Hulk. It ran two seasons, for 21 episodes, on the television network UPN from 1996 to 1997. Lou Ferrigno, who portrayed the Hulk on the live-action TV series from 1978 to 1982, provided the Hulk's voice.

The show often featured cameo appearances by characters from other Marvel cartoons of the period. In the second season, the show's format, after UPN decided that season one was too dark, was changed, and to give "female viewers a chance", the network ordered that She-Hulk be made a regular co-star, as a result; the series was officially renamed The Incredible Hulk and She-Hulk for the second season. The second season also featured Grey Hulk, who previously made two cameo appearances in the first season.

Series overview

Season 1
The first season begins with Dr. Robert Bruce Banner already established as the Hulk and on the run, when he is captured by the military after another attempt at ridding himself of the beast within goes awry due to the sabotage of Major Glenn Talbot. He eventually escapes and falls into the hands of the Leader who is served by the Gargoyle and the Abomination. The intervention of mutated cave-dwelling gamma creatures called the Outcasts, Banner's loyal best friend Rick Jones, and the love of his life Betty Ross (like in many comic book incarnations, Betty along with Doc Samson is seen here trying to find a cure for Bruce).

As in the comics, Thunderbolt Ross is a former 4-star turned 3-star general who sends Army forces and Hulkbusters (Dr. Craig Saunders, Jr., and Dr. Samuel J. La Roquette (later Redeemer and Rock, respectively) were also mentioned as members) to capture or destroy the Hulk. He also fights the Hulk personally, using a gamma-powered laser gun created by Bruce against the creature in "Return of the Beast, parts 1 and 2", and again in "Darkness and Light part 3". Talbot was shown acting as the right-hand man of General Ross. He is also shown to have a romantic interest in Betty Ross, but she constantly rejects him because he never does a very good job of hiding his disdain for either Bruce Banner or the Hulk.

Traveling across the nation and beyond, Banner meets kindred spirits also battling similar problems, fights beings of pure energy, and must endure an alliance with the Gargoyle to provide the antidote to a viral epidemic that nearly takes Betty's life and countless others. Not even his family is safe from the terror his hidden powers bring, as his best friend and cousin Jennifer Walters is critically injured by Doctor Doom, forcing Banner to give her a blood transfusion that transforms her into the She-Hulk. Jennifer takes immediate delight in her transformed body and chooses to remain in her She-Hulk form full-time.

Dorian Harewood reprised his role of War Machine from the solo Iron Man animated series in the episode "Helping Hand, Iron Fist". He originally stops Rick Jones from seeing Tony Stark (voiced by Robert Hays, who was also reprising his Iron Man role) at Stark Enterprises, but takes him to Stark after Jones explained that he needed Stark's help to find Banner. He later alerts Stark to the arrival of General Ross, S.H.I.E.L.D. agent Gabriel Jones, and a squad of Hulkbusters. War Machine fights some of the Hulkbusters alongside Jones and Iron Man.

Sasquatch appeared in episthe ode "Man to Man, Beast to Beast" voiced by Peter Strauss (Walter Langkowski) and Clancy Brown (Sasquatch). In that episode, Bruce Banner comes to Canada hoping to find his old friend Dr. Walter Langkowski (Sasquatch) to get a cure for himself and get rid of Hulk forever, only to find that Walter has developed a bestial alter ego while using himself as a test subject to make a breakthrough in gamma radiation. After battling the Hulk, Walter/Sasquatch exiles himself to the wilderness when his actions put Hulk's new friend, a small boy named Taylor, in danger.

Simon Templeman reprised his role of Doctor Doom (who as previously mentioned, critically injured Jennifer Walters/She-Hulk) for guest appearances in two episodes, in which Doom held Washington, D.C. captive, only to be defeated by She-Hulk, whom he later attempted to claim revenge upon. With his appearance on this show, it can be assumed that Doom survived the fate he met on the Fantastic Four series if both shows are to be considered within the same continuity.

Following Doctor Doom's first appearance (he would appear again in the second-season episode "Hollywood Rocks"), came the episode "Fantastic Fortitude" featuring his nemesis, the Fantastic Four. The episode seems to place this show in the same continuity as the Fantastic Four cartoon of the same decade as this episode plays off the Hulk's appearance in the other show. More to the point, Beau Weaver (Reed Richards/Mister Fantastic) and Chuck McCann (Ben Grimm/The Thing) reprised their roles from the Fantastic Four series. In the episode, Mister Fantastic and the other Fantastic Four take their vacation before Hulk, She-Hulk, and Thing fight Leader's Gamma Soldiers commanded by Leader's minion Ogress. Meanwhile, She-Hulk flirted with Thing, but Ben chose to rekindle his relationship with Alicia Masters. And while the Yancy Street Gang was absent in the solo Fantastic Four cartoon itself, they appeared in "Fantastic Fortitude", where they pull a prank on the Thing. After being defeated by the villain Ogress, the Gang, always off camera, distributes leaflets marked "The Thing Whopped by a Woman!".

Also reprising his role from Fantastic Four was John Rhys-Davies as Thor in "Mortal Bounds", while Mark L. Taylor voiced his alter-ego, Donald Blake. Donald as Thor brought Hulk to Detroit so that Bruce Banner can help cure a gamma-based outbreak unintentionally caused by Gargoyle (in his search to cure his disfigurement).

Throughout the season running sub-plots gradually unfold, centering mostly on several of the supporting cast, the season slowly covers the following:

 Betty attempts to construct a Gamma Nutrient Bath that will separate Banner from the Hulk with the aid of Doc Samson.
 The Leader's fragile association with The Gargoyle slowly breaks down, shattering completely before eventually reforming before the finale. This Gargoyle is the Yuri Topolov version who was always trying to find a cure for his mutation, even allying himself with The Leader. In "Mortal Bounds," he accidentally released a gamma virus (infecting amongst others Betty Ross) in his search for a cure. When Ross was dying from the virus, Gargoyle gave Bruce Banner the antidote, warning that the next time they met he would not be so favorable.
 The Leader succeeds in bringing to life obedient mutant Gamma Warriors upon creating them from Hulk's DNA where they also sport cybernetic parts. Two of them were named in the toy line, the female Gamma Warrior with the chainsaw for a right arm was named "Chainsaw" and the two-headed Gamma Warrior with a cannon for a right hand was named "Two-Head." The rest of the Gamma Warriors consist of an unnamed Gamma Warrior with fangs, an unnamed Gamma Warrior with missile launchers on his back, an unnamed Gamma Warrior with a flail for a right hand, and an unnamed metal-jawed Gamma Warrior with rotating blades for a right hand. They are led by the disfigured Ogress.
 General Ross' tempered alliance with Agent Gabriel Jones of S.H.I.E.L.D., a ruthless covert operative whose orders were to destroy the creature completely upon capture. In the series finale, "Mission: Incredible", it was revealed that Jones was partially responsible for the accident that turned a double agent named Diana into the Hybrid when she fell into a tank of newly discovered organisms (which S.H.I.E.L.D. was experimenting on) at a S.H.I.E.L.D. Sea Base when she was hired to steal one of those organisms. Also in that episode, he starts hitting on She-Hulk.

These plot threads converge in the three-part season finale "Darkness and Light", where Betty's gamble pays off and the Hulk and Banner are separated. The Hulk emerges virtually mindless and unrestrained. Banner feels responsible and confronts the creature in an armored battlesuit. The Leader finally gains the power of the Hulk, but the savage Hulk personality takes over, driving him mad, and forcing him to abandon the power and restore it to the creature.

Meanwhile, General Ross, betrayed by Agent Jones during the finale, experiences a mental breakdown. Though hospitalized and in critical condition, Ross interrupts Banner's wedding ceremony and threatens to kill Banner, who suffers a heart attack, as the separation from the Hulk finally begins taking its toll. This leads Banner's friends into concluding that he and the Hulk must be merged again, or both will die.

Ross flees but later returns in an attempt to sabotage the re-merge experiment. He is interrupted by Rick, whom he hurls into the vat containing Banner and the Hulk. The experiment malfunctions and the vat erupts; from it emerges a gamma-powered, hulk-like Jones, who escapes into the night, as the distraught but healthy Banner suddenly transforms into the Grey Hulk.

Season 2
The Incredible Hulk and She-Hulk begins where the first season concluded, with the Grey Hulk in the mountains, solely pursued by the still insane Ross. An altercation between the two results in an avalanche that puts Ross in a coma, and knocks out Banner. When Banner comes to, he is arrested and placed on trial, while Rick Jones, almost an afterthought, continues his own reign of terror. Banner's cousin Jennifer, the She-Hulk, tries to help him out in court. After defending the entire courthouse from an attack by the Leader and successfully locating and restoring Rick to normal, both Banner and Jennifer travel together, lying low.

Aside from a small continuation of the premiere episode, the season featured very few ongoing arcs, the only ones of note were the following:

 General Ross is hospitalized.
 Gargoyle displays a strong affection for She-Hulk.
 Rick Jones no longer plays an active role (except in Bruce's memories).
 Banner becomes more quick-witted and serene, no longer hunted by the army. He still tries to cure himself of becoming the Hulk.
 Whenever Banner transforms, Grey Hulk and Green Hulk fight for control in Banner's mind and the one who wins, breaks out.

The remainder of the season saw Banner and Jennifer either team up with characters such as Doctor Strange, battle Doctor Doom once more, or participate in a fight during Jennifer's high school reunion party (where She-Hulk temporarily changed back to Jennifer). The episode "Mind Over Anti-Matter" features Doctor Strange and She-Hulk journeying into the mind of Bruce Banner when Banner is possessed by an evil demon alien. Banner in the process turns into a monstrous Dark Hulk. She-Hulk provides levity at the sorcerer's expense by referring to him as Doctor Peculiar and other variations of his name. The Grey Hulk's mob persona of "Mr. Fixit" surfaced for a brief appearance.

This season won an Emmy Award for "best audio editing" for the work on the episode "The Lost Village".

Cast
 Neal McDonough – Dr. Bruce Banner (all episodes)
 Lou Ferrigno – Green Hulk (all episodes)
 Michael Donovan – Grey Hulk (5 episodes)
 Genie Francis – Betty Ross (first voice, 6 episodes)
 Philece Sampler – Betty Ross (second voice, 9 episodes)
 Kevin Michael Richardson – Dark Hulk
 Luke Perry – Rick Jones (10 episodes)
 John Vernon – General Thunderbolt Ross (14 episodes)
 Kevin Schon – Major Glenn Talbot, Abomination (first voice, 2 episodes), Samuel Laroquette, Zzzax (season 1 only)
 Matt Frewer – Samuel Sterns / Leader (10 episodes)
 Mark Hamill – Gargoyle (11 episodes)
 Kathy Ireland – Ogress (5 episodes)
 Richard Moll – Abomination (second voice, 3 episodes), Homeless Man (season 1, episode 9)
 Shadoe Stevens – Doc Samson (season 1; 6 episodes)
 Thom Barry – Agent Gabriel Jones (8 episodes)
 Lisa Zane – Jennifer Walters / She-Hulk (season 1; 2 episodes)
 Cree Summer – Jennifer Walters / She-Hulk (season 2; 8 episodes)
 Richard Grieco – Ghost Rider (season 1, episode 5)
 Peter Strauss – Dr. Walter Langkowski (season 1, episode 6)
 Clancy Brown – Sasquatch (season 1, episode 6)
 Michael Horse – Jefferson Whitedeer (season 1, episode 10)

Crew
 Stu Rosen - Casting Director
 Tom Tatranowicz - Voice Director (season 1)
 Jamie Simone - Voice Director (season 2)

Episodes

Season 1 (1996–1997)

Season 2 (1997)

Broadcast and home media
The show was briefly aired on ABC Family as part of its unnamed pre-JETIX-era action/adventure-oriented programming kids’ morning block, following the release of the live-action movie in 2003, as well as a DVD release. The show also aired on Toon Disney as a part of their primetime action-adventure block, Jetix. The show also became the last program to air on Toon Disney. The series previously aired on Disney XD from February 13, 2009, to March 31, 2012.

An episode of the show was released on the DVD with issue 17 of Jetix Magazine.

In 2008, the series was released on Region 2 DVD in the UK in by Liberation Entertainment as part of a release schedule of Marvel animated series. Currently only two volumes which contain the entire first season were released. Since then the rights then went to Lace International, following Liberation Entertainment's closure. The rights have since been re-acquired by Clear Vision, who re-released the set on July 5, 2010, Season 2 (Incredible Hulk and She-Hulk) was released in the UK on September 6, 2010.

It is currently owned and distributed by The Walt Disney Company, which acquired all Fox Kids-related properties from News Corporation and Saban International in 2001.

All 21 episodes were previously available for streaming on Marvel.com and on Netflix. The series now streams on Disney+.

Merchandising
Toys based on the show were produced.

Syndication
Following the success of the live-action Marvel films featuring the Hulk, The Walt Disney Company began airing the series in syndication.

Home media
The entire series is available on iTunes, Amazon Prime Video, Hulu Plus and Vudu.

The series became available on Disney's streaming service Disney+ upon its launch on November 12, 2019.

VHS releases
Region 1
During the series' run, some episodes were released on VHS. These were from 20th Century Fox Home Entertainment.

In the late 1990s, another selection of VHS compilations were released by Marvel Films/New World Entertainment (these tapes were distributed in Canada by Telegenic Entertainment). These releases featured episodes edited into 80 minute movies based on the particular story arc.

To date, the only VHS and DVD releases of the series in the U.S. have been several volume sets from Buena Vista Home Entertainment that feature 4-5 episodes each.

DVD releases

Region 2
In the UK, Sweden, and Germany, 20th Century Fox Home Entertainment and Clear Vision Ltd. has released all six seasons on DVD as of November 24, 2008 and September 6, 2010.

Other releases
 A Canadian VHS containing three episodes from the "Raw Power" episodes. This is a reissue of the 1997 Marvel-New World/Telegenic VHS release (and it was mastered from one of those VHS releases); as a "Bonus" two episodes from the 1990s Fantastic Four TV series are included, just like on the VHS release. (Please note there are no audio/subtitle selections.)
Canadians also received another DVD release of the first season two-parter "Return of the Beast".  This was a re-release of a 2002 VHS release by Disney; the video quality of the episodes on the DVD is that of a VHS transfer.  There are no bonus features or audio/subtitle selections on this DVD either.
 A VCD release by Magnavision Home Video.
 A boxed set of all the DVDs released in Poland, simply entitled "The Incredible Hulk: 1 DVD Set". The front of the box features the same graphics as "Return of the Beast".
 Several two-episode DVDs released by Marvel in 2003 prior to the acquisition by Disney.
 Three DVDs with two episodes each were released regionally for Serbia and Montenegro, Croatia, Slovenia, Bosnia and Herzegovina and Macedonia with Serbian, Croatian and Slovenian dubs on them in 2003.
 The entire first season is available on Xbox Live and iTunes through Disney XD. All five seasons are also currently available for digital purchase on Vudu.
 The entire series is available on Amazon Video.
 There were also unlicensed DVDs that had The Adventure Continues on them that contained two episodes from most of the movies that were released by Marvel Films/New World Entertainment. For example, one was Fantastic Four - The Silver Surfer and the Coming of Galactus, which contained two episodes which were "The Silver Surfer and the Coming of Galactus" Parts 1 & 2, a two-part story episode from the second season, making it like a movie based on the toy line, Fantastic Four: Galactus.

References

External links

 
 DRG4's The Incredible Hulk: The Animated Series Page
 epguides.com - Titles and Air Dates Guide
 International Catalogue of Superheroes
 Pazsaz Entertainment Network: The Incredible Hulk
 Marvel Animation Age - The Incredible Hulk
 Incredible Hulk 1996 Cartoon Series - Synopses and screenshots 

Hulk (comics) television series
1990s American animated television series
1996 American television series debuts
1997 American television series endings
American children's animated action television series
American children's animated adventure television series
American children's animated drama television series
American children's animated science fantasy television series
American children's animated superhero television series
Animated series produced by Marvel Studios
Animated television series based on Marvel Comics
Television series about nuclear war and weapons
Television series by Marvel Productions
Television series by Saban Entertainment
Television shows based on Marvel Comics
UPN Kids
UPN original programming
Works by Len Wein